The Burntside State Forest is a state forest located near the town of Ely in Lake and Saint Louis counties, Minnesota. 82% of the forest land falls within the limits of the Boundary Waters Canoe Area Wilderness to the north which belongs to the Superior National Forest, and thus falls under the federal jurisdiction of the United States Forest Service. 

There are over 43 lakes in the forest, the rough topography of the area is due to its situation in the Laurentian Upland. There are six public accesses to the  Burntside Lake within the forest, which has substantial populations of walleye, lake trout, and the common loon.

Prior to the arrival of lumberjacks in the late nineteenth century, the majority of the forest was covered with young jack pine, a nearly unprofitable timber tree. The land speculators and lumberjacks left that area in 1874, after a wildfire destroyed what was left of trees nearing maturity and jack pine and aspen were established.

References

Minnesota state forests
Protected areas of Lake County, Minnesota
Protected areas of St. Louis County, Minnesota
Protected areas established in 1905
1905 establishments in Minnesota